TDRS-5, known before launch as TDRS-E, is an American communications satellite, of first generation, which is operated by NASA as part of the Tracking and Data Relay Satellite System. It was constructed by TRW is based on a custom satellite bus which was used for all seven first generation TDRS satellites.

History

It was launched aboard  during the STS-43 mission. Atlantis launched from Launch Complex 39A at the Kennedy Space Center on 2 August 1991 at 15:01:59 UTC (11:01:59 EDT). TDRS-E was deployed from Atlantis around six hours after launch, and was raised to geostationary orbit by means of an Inertial Upper Stage. It was the only TDRS satellite to be deployed from Atlantis.

Deployment
The twin-stage solid-propellent Inertial Upper Stage made two burns. The first stage burn occurred shortly after deployment, from Atlantis, and placed the satellite into a geostationary transfer orbit (GTO). Around six hours later, it reached apogee, and the second stage fired, placing TDRS-E into geosynchronous orbit. At this point, it received its operational designation, TDRS-5. It was placed at a position over the equator, 174.0° West of the Greenwich Meridian, from where it provides communications services to spacecraft in Earth orbit, including the Space Shuttle and International Space Station.

See also 

 List of TDRS satellites

References

Communications satellites in geostationary orbit
Spacecraft launched in 1991
TDRS satellites
Spacecraft launched by the Space Shuttle